was a Japanese novelist of the Meiji era. His real name was Akira Kawakami (川上 亮, Kawakami Akira). Born in Osaka Prefecture, he dropped out of the school of liberal arts in Tokyo University and joined Ken'yusha. After struggling with the rise of naturalist literature yet remaining a popular author until his death, he died by suicide at age 40.

Aozora Bunko has a digitalized collection of his works.

Notes 

University of Tokyo alumni
People from Osaka
Suicides by sharp instrument in Japan
1869 births
1908 suicides
19th-century Japanese novelists
20th-century Japanese novelists